José Luis Maldonado Ramos (b. Guadalajara, Jalisco, 26 July 1987), better known by his stage name C-Kan, is a Mexican Rapper, singer and songwriter signed to Mastred Trax since 2012. He became popular in 2012 through his success on social networks, with his demo "Voy Por El Sueño De Muchos" (2012) "Classification C, Vol. 1" (2014). "Vivo La Vida Cantando" is the title of the first single from his second album, entitled Clasificación C. In 2015, C-Kan released his third album entitled "Clasificacion C, Vol. 2". HMexiCKanos was released on 20 November 2016 in physical format in Mexico and in digital format (on iTunes). C-Kan has over 5 million subscribers on its YouTube channel and over 1000 million views. He worked with artists such as MC Davo, Don Dinero, Don Cheto, Lil Rob, T Lopez, Chingo Bling, Baby Bash, SPM, King Lil G and 50 Cent, MC Magic, Pipo Ti, and Sick Jacken.

Career
C-Kan began rapping when he was a teenager, rhyming about life in the streets, gangs, drugs and violence. His first group mixtape, 'Get Money', released in 2006. That same year his first individual mixtape arrived: ‘Déjenme Afinar los Gallos’.

In 2007, he released his second mixtape, called "Siluetas del Rap", and a few months after, he released "Déjame Afilar Los Gallos". Following this h was signed by Mastered Trax Latino. Along with fellow rappers, Bodka37 and Masibo, C-Kan formed a group called Radikales, releasing their first single "La Rebelión de un Sueño" by the end of 2007.

For the following years, he focused on new singles and improving his onstage performance. He attracted attention through his music videos posted on YouTube, as well as appearances on Mexican news programs where he spoke about the social issues in his lyrics.

2012–2015
C-Kan signed to Mastered Trax Latino in 2012, and released his first album: 'Voy por el sueño de muchos'. Two years later he released his second album as part of Mastered Trax, titled ‘Clasificación C’, followed by ‘Clasificación C, Vol. 2’ (2015).

2016–present
C-Kan made his debut as a soundtrack composer in 2016 for Pantelion Films newest movie, Compadres. On 1 July 2016, he released the album, 'Antes de Todo'.

After trying for years to get a visa, to have stepped on important stages, close great deals and about to make a tour in more than 15 different counties. He expressed his feelings to his team and decided not to return to the United States if Donald Trump came to the presidency, at least until he leaves office, personally felt like visiting the home of someone who does not like him.

On 26 May 2017 he released a collaboration album with Pipo Ti called "Dias de Sol".

Musical style
Maldonado states his musical influences are reggaeton & rap. Maldonado stated that his biggest influences are rappers like Control Machete, Cypress Hill, Dyablo, Magisterio, Caballeros del Plan G, Gamberroz, Big Boy and Vico C.

Maldonado's music has been known as "reggaetonero" and "romantic rapper". Most of his songs are often used autotune.

Personal life
C-Kan was born and raised in the city of Guadalajara. At the age of 12 his father died, and he began making a life on the streets of Guadalajara. Alongside crime and violence, rap was also part of his life, and at 16, Ramos Maldonado discovered his talent for it. In addition to being known as a rapper, C-Kan is also known for supporting the free use of marijuana in México. In an interview for the Costa Ricain newspaper La Nación, he admitted using it and stated that he considers it does not affect his job; in fact, it makes it better. He is also father of a child. sureno 13

Tours 
 MC Davo vs C-Kan
 Dos Tipos de Cuidado
 Días de Sol

 Urbano Fest

Discography

studio albums

Music videos

References

Mexican male rappers
21st-century Mexican male singers
1987 births
Living people
Mexican reggaeton musicians